Ouk Rabun is a Cambodian politician, and the current Minister of Rural Development, previously serving as the Minister of Agriculture, Forestry and Fisheries. He is a member of the Cambodian People's Party.

References

Members of the National Assembly (Cambodia)
Living people
Cambodian People's Party politicians
1951 births
Government ministers of Cambodia
People from Kampong Chhnang province